Acacia singula is a shrub belonging to the genus Acacia and the subgenus Juliflorae that is endemic to western Australia

It blooms from August to October producing yellow flowers.

It is native to an area in the Goldfields-Esperance and Wheatbelt regions of Western Australia where it is often situated on hilltops and rises growing in sandy or gravelly soils often over or around laterite.

See also
List of Acacia species

References

singula
Acacias of Western Australia
Plants described in 1995
Taxa named by Bruce Maslin